Métamorphose may refer to:

 "Métamorphose" (song), a 1989 song by Amanda Lear
 Métamorphose (album), a 1984 album by Sortilège
 Métamorphose (renamer), an open source batch renamer

See also
 Metamorfoz, an album by Tarkan
 Metamorphoses (disambiguation)